From the Beginning is a box set which presents aural and visual documentation celebrating Emerson, Lake & Palmer's career; consisting of five discs that include a number of single b-sides, significant live recordings, alternative studio mixes and material taken from band rehearsals, plus a bonus DVD featuring 'The Manticore Years' documentary, presented in a deluxe book-style sleeve complete with a 60-page picture booklet containing extensive sleeve notes by the band discussing the ELP years. It also contains rare and previously unseen photographs and images.

Track listing

Disc one

The 2012 reissue omits the first track (Epitaph). Its addition was done without permission from the rights holder, Discipline Global Mobile.

"Epitaph" – King Crimson (Robert Fripp, Michael Giles, Greg Lake, Ian McDonald, Peter Sinfield) – 8:45
"Decline and Fall" – Atomic Rooster (Vincent Crane, Carl Palmer, Nick Graham) – 5:47
"Fantasia: Intermezzo Karelia Suite" – The Nice (Jean Sibelius, arr. by Keith Emerson, Joseph Eger) – 8:51
"Lucky Man" (Lake) – 4:38
"Tank" (Emerson, Palmer) – 6:48
"Take a Pebble" (Lake) – 12:28
"The Barbarian" (Live version - Lyceum Theatre, 1970) (Emerson, Lake, Palmer, Béla Bartók) – 5:20
"Knife-Edge" (Live version - Lyceum Theatre, 1970) (Emerson, Lake, Leoš Janáček) – 8:01
"Rondo" (Live version - Lyceum Theatre, 1970) (Dave Brubeck, arr. by Emerson) – 18:18

Disc two
"Tarkus" – 20:40
a) "Eruption" (Emerson)
b) "Stones of Years" (Emerson, Lake)
c) "Iconoclast" (Emerson)
d) "Mass" (Emerson, Lake)
e) "Manticore" (Emerson)
f) "The Battlefield" (Lake)
g) "Aquatarkus" (Emerson)
"Bitches Crystal" (Emerson) – 3:54
"A Time and a Place" (B-side single version) (Emerson, Lake, Palmer) – 3:55
"Oh, My Father" (Previously unreleased) (Lake) – 2:58
"The Endless Enigma (Part One)" (Emerson, Lake) – 4:04
"Fugue" (Emerson, Lake) – 4:54
"The Endless Enigma (Part Two)" (Emerson, Lake) – 2:00
"From the Beginning" (Lake) – 4:13
"Trilogy" (Emerson, Lake) – 8:52
"Abbadon's Bolero" (Emerson) – 8:07
"Hoedown" (Live version - Milan, 1973) (Aaron Copland, arr. by Emerson, Lake, Palmer) – 3:54
"Jerusalem" (First mix) (Hubert Parry, William Blake, arr. by Emerson, Lake, Palmer) – 2:54
"Still...You Turn Me On" (First mix) (Lake) – 2:51
"When the Apple Blossoms" (B-side single version) (Emerson, Lake, Palmer) – 3:56

Disc three
"Karn Evil 9" – 29:42
a) "1st Impression Pt.1" (Emerson, Lake)
b) "1st Impression Pt.2" (Emerson, Lake)
c) "2nd Impression" (Emerson)
d) "3rd Impression" (Emerson, Lake, Peter Sinfield)
"Jeremy Bender/The Sheriff" (Live) (Emerson, Lake) – 5:03
"C'est la Vie (Early version)" (Lake, Sinfield) – 4:16
"I Believe in Father Christmas" (Early version) (Lake, Sinfield, Sergei Prokofiev) – 3:29
"The Enemy God Dances with the Black Spirits" (Prokofiev, arr. by Palmer) – 3:20
"Piano Concerto No.1" (Emerson) – 18:25
First Movement: "Allegro Giocoso"
Second Movement: "Andante Molto Cantabile"
Third Movement: "Toccata Con Fuoco"
"Pirates (Non-orchestral live version - Nassau Coliseum, 1978)" (Emerson, Lake, Sinfield) – 13:23

Disc four
"Aaron Copland Interview 1977" (From Keith Emerson's archives) – 1:37
"Fanfare for the Common Man" (Copland, arr. by Emerson, Lake, Palmer) – 9:42
"Honky Tonk Train Blues" (Lewis) – 3:09
"Tiger in a Spotlight" (Emerson, Lake, Palmer, Sinfield) – 4:33
"Watching Over You" (Lake/Sinfield) – 3:54
"Introductory Fanfare/Peter Gunn Theme (Live version)" (Emerson, Henry Mancini) – 4:26
"Canario (Rehearsal)" (Joaquín Rodrigo) – 3:57
"Mars – The Bringer of War" (Gustav Holst, arr. by Emerson, Lake, Cozy Powell) – 7:54
"Desede La Vida" (Emerson, Robert Berry, Palmer) – 7:06
"Desede La Vida" 
"LaVista"
"Sangre De Toro"
"Black Moon (Single version)" (Emerson, Lake, Palmer) – 4:47
"Footprints in the Snow" (Emerson, Lake, Palmer) – 3:51
"Romeo and Juliet (Live at the Royal Albert Hall, 1992)" (Prokofiev, arr. by Emerson) – 3:32
"Man in the Long Black Coat" (Bob Dylan, arr. by Emerson) – 4:12
"Daddy" (Lake) – 4:42
"Hang on to a Dream" (ELP cover of a song from The Nice) (Tim Hardin, Aber) – 4:28
"Touch and Go" (Live in Poland, 1997) (Emerson, Lake) – 3:53

Disc five
(Live from the Mar y Sol Pop Festival, Manatí, Puerto Rico, 2 April 1972) 
"Hoedown" (Copland, arr. by Emerson, Lake, Palmer) – 4:18
"Tarkus" – 22:33
a) "Eruption" (Emerson)
b) "Stones of Years" (Emerson, Lake)
c) "Iconoclast" (Emerson)
d) "Mass" (Emerson, Lake)
e) "Manticore" (Emerson)
f) "The Battlefield" (Lake)
g) "Aquatarkus" (Emerson)
"Take a Pebble" (Lake) – 4:36
"Lucky Man" (Lake) – 3:00
"Piano Improvisation - 'Take a Pebble' conclusion" (Emerson) – 9:44
"Pictures at an Exhibition" – 14:39
a) "Promenade" (Modest Mussorgsky, Lake)
b) "The Gnome" (Palmer)
c) "Promenade – Vocal" (Mussorgsky, Emerson, Lake)
d) "The Hut of Baba Yaga" (Mussorgsky, Emerson)
e) "The Great Gates of Kiev" (Emerson, Lake)
"Rondo" (Brubeck, arr. by Emerson) – 18:29

Disc six
"The Manticore Special" – DVD containing highlights from the 1973 World Tour.
Written and directed by Nick Hague
Edited by Chris Fraser
Director of photography – John Rosenberg
Production manager – Peter Jaques
Sound recordist – Tony Jackson
Produced by Miker Rosenberg

Personnel
Keith Emerson – keyboards (Hammond Organ, Mini Moog, Moog Modular, Grand Piano, Upright Piano)
Greg Lake – guitars, bass guitar, vocals
Carl Palmer – drums, percussion

References

Emerson, Lake & Palmer compilation albums
Albums produced by Greg Lake
Albums produced by Keith Emerson
Albums produced by Carl Palmer
2007 compilation albums